Silao Malo (born 30 December 1990, in Samoa) is a footballer who plays as a midfielder for Vaimoso and Samoa.

On 26 November 2011, Malo scored the winning goal against American Samoa that qualified Samoa to OFC Nations Cup for the first time. Malo also scored the only Samoan goal at 2012 OFC Nations Cup in a 10–1 loss against Tahiti at their debut. In the following match, against Vanuatu, he was fouled inside the penalty box, but Andrew Setefano failed to score from the penalty spot.

International goals

References

External links

1990 births
Living people
Samoan footballers
Kiwi FC players
Samoa international footballers
Association football midfielders
2012 OFC Nations Cup players
2016 OFC Nations Cup players